The Assam roofed turtle or Sylhet roofed turtle (Pangshura sylhetensis) is a turtle species of the family Geoemydidae found in the Brahmaputra-Meghna drainage in India (Assam) and parts of eastern Bangladesh. It was formerly placed in the genus Batagur and the defunct genus Kachuga.

Description

The species has a triangular and elevated carapace with a prominent spiked keel and 26 strongly serrated marginal plates. The carapace is olive brown, with a lighter (yellowish to beige) keel. The head is small and has a weakly hooked upper jaw; a narrow pink stripe runs from the back of each eye to the middle of the back of the head. Adults may attain a maximum length of 20.5 cm, although body sizes of 16 cm are more common.

The species' local names include dura kaso (দূৰা কাছ) in Assamese, śileṭi kaiṭṭa (সিলেটি কাইট্টা), śileṭi kori kaiṭṭa (সিলেটি কড়ি কাইট্টা), kãṭa kachim (কাঁটা কাছিম) and kaṭua~xaṭua/kauṭa~xauta (কাটুয়া/কাউটা) in Bengali.

Distribution and habitat
The species occurs in the north-eastern and south-eastern parts of Bangladesh, in India (Assam) and possibly in Bhutan. It is found in terrestrial and freshwater habitats in areas with upland tropical moist forest, and fast-flowing streams and perhaps also small rivers. Oxbow lakes may also be inhabited, but shell morphology suggests an adaptation to fast-flowing waters.

Ecology
The species is amphibious. In the cooler months of the dry season, from December to February, it basks during most of the day; individuals living in cooler hill streams may do so year round. The turtle is shy and never basks on river banks, but only on emergent logs or rocks. At the slightest disturbance, it will dive quickly to the middle of the river, hiding between rocks. Juveniles often flee into accumulations of dead leaves for camouflage and remain motionless.

Reproduction
Assam roofed turtles nest between late October and February, corresponding with the cool, dry season, and produce clutches of 6 to 12 eggs. Hatchlings appear mainly between March and April, at the beginning of the southeast monsoons. The eggs need to undergo a diapause at cooler temperatures lasting between 6 and 8 weeks in order to hatch successfully.

Conservation
The Assam roofed turtle is a rare species known only from a few individuals; it is believed to have one of the narrowest distributions of any south Asian geoemydid. It is exploited for its meat and eggs for local consumption and collected for the pet trade, especially in Asia where this turtle fetches high prices as pets. Habitat destruction by logging and incidental capture in fishing gear are also thought to present threats. The species is currently classified as critically endangered by the IUCN.

References

Further reading

External links

 

Pangshura
Reptiles of India